Men's 10 metre air pistol was one of the thirteen shooting events at the 1992 Summer Olympics. This second installment of the event was won by Wang Yifu ahead of the world record holder Sergei Pyzhianov, and Sorin Babii who had established the Olympic record on the new target in the qualification round but lost the final.

Qualification round

OR Olympic record – Q Qualified for final

Final

OR Olympic record

References

Sources

Shooting at the 1992 Summer Olympics
Men's events at the 1992 Summer Olympics